You Forgot It in People is the second studio album by Canadian indie rock band Broken Social Scene, released on October 15, 2002. It was the band's commercial breakthrough. You Forgot It in People features intricate, experimental production techniques and a large number of instruments coinciding with the band's vastly expanded size. Local excitement for the album was so big that initial pressings sold out quickly, causing the need for a 2003 reissue.

Music videos were made for "Stars and Sons", "Cause = Time", "Almost Crimes (Radio Kills Remix)", "Lover's Spit", and "I'm Still Your Fag".

The songs that did not make it onto the album were featured in a B-sides compilation entitled Bee Hives, released in 2004.

Music
After releasing Feel Good Lost, Broken Social Scene changed their style from making ambient instrumental songs to full-blown rock songs. As they expanded to an 11 piece collective, Broken Social Scene used a variety of sounds for the album. Reflecting on this, frontman Kevin Drew said "I was scared to see if people were going to embrace the idea of a whole shitload of sounds on one album." You Forgot It in People also progresses to "proper" song style with defined verses and choruses.

Reception

The album received acclaim from critics. According to review aggregate site Metacritic, the album received a normalized score of 86 out of 100 based on 18 reviews, indicating "universal acclaim". Reviews for the album were almost unanimously positive. Pitchforks Ryan Schreiber gave the album a 9.2 out of 10 saying "You Forgot It in People explodes with song after song of endlessly re-playable, perfect pop." The songs "Cause = Time" and "Stars and Sons" are listed at No. 145 and No. 275 on Pitchfork Media's Top 500 Songs of the 2000s list, respectively. A Kludge writer called it a "majestic" album, in which the group created a "unique sound of lush instrumentation." A PopMatters review for the album was positive, although criticized the song "I'm Still Your Fag" for its "uncomfortably graphic lyrics". Conversely, Robert Christgau of The Village Voice selected "Almost Crimes (Radio Kills Remix)" as a "choice cut", indicating a "good song on an album that isn't worth your time or money." In 2003, the album won the Juno Award for Alternative Album of the Year. The album received the following accolades:

By 2005, sales in the United States had exceeded 77,000 copies, according to Nielsen SoundScan.

In 2018, the album won the Polaris Heritage Prize Audience Award in the 1996-2005 category.

Track listing
All songs written by Kevin Drew and Brendan Canning.

On the 2003 re-release, track 4 is listed as "Almost Crimes", track 7 as "Anthems for a Seventeen Year Old Girl" and track 9 as "Late Night Bedroom Rock for the Missionaries".

Personnel
 Kevin Drew – keyboards, vocals, guitar, feedback, bass, drums, piano
 Brendan Canning − bass, double bass, vocals, organ, acoustic guitar, drum machine, guitar, piano, keyboards
 Andrew Whiteman − guitar, tres, organ, vocals, bass, keyboards, tambourine
 Charles Spearin − guitar, bass, percussion, drum machine, harmonica, effects, acoustic guitar, organ, sampler
 Justin Peroff − drums, percussion, shaker, artwork
 John Crossingham − guitar, feedback, drums, bass
 Evan Cranley − trombone, strings, percussion
 James Shaw − trumpet, guitar, acoustic guitar
 Feist − vocals
 Emily Haines − vocals
 Jessica Moss − violin
 Ohad Benchetrit − flute
 Bill Priddle − guitar
 Brodie West − saxophone
 Susannah Brady − speaking
 David Newfeld − producer, mastering
 Noah Mintz − mastering
 Louise Upperton − artwork design

References

2002 albums
Broken Social Scene albums
Paper Bag Records albums
Arts & Crafts Productions albums
Juno Award for Alternative Album of the Year albums